ORP Fala is a Polish patrol craft of the Project 912 class (NATO: Obluze Class). She was the first ship of a five-ship series, commissioned in 1965. Of a Polish design, they were built in Gdynia. Fala means 'the wave'.

She initially wore a number: OP-301, then: 321. Initially she served in the Border Brigade of the Polish Navy, then in 1991 she, along with the other four ships, was given to the Polish Border Guard (receiving a new livery).

After decommissioning in 1996, Fala was opened as a museum ship in Kolobrzeg, as part of the Muzeum Oręża Polskiego exhibition.

References

Jarosław Ciślak (in Polish): Polska Marynarka Wojenna 1995 (Polish Navy 1995), Warsaw 1995, 
Robert Rochowicz (in Polish): Historia "912-ek" - patrolowców i ścigaczy (Story of the 912s - patrol and ASW craft), in: Morza, Statki i Okręty nr. 5/2004

Museum ships in Poland
Ships of the Polish Navy
Patrol vessels of the Cold War
Kołobrzeg
1965 ships